Roßbach is an Ortsgemeinde – a community belonging to a Verbandsgemeinde – in the Westerwaldkreis in Rhineland-Palatinate, Germany.

Geography

The community lies between Hachenburg and Dierdorf. The residential community of Roßbach belongs to the Verbandsgemeinde of Hachenburg, a kind of collective municipality. Its seat is in the like-named town.

Politics

The municipal council is made up of 13 council members, including the extraofficial mayor (Bürgermeister), who were elected in a municipal election on 13 June 2004.

Economy and infrastructure

Roßbach lies west of Bundesstraße 413 from Bendorf (near Koblenz) to Hachenburg. The nearest Autobahn interchanges are in Dierdorf on the A 3 (Cologne–Frankfurt). The nearest InterCityExpress stop is the railway station at Montabaur on the Cologne-Frankfurt high-speed rail line.

References

External links
 Roßbach 
 Roßbach in the collective municipality’s Web pages 

Municipalities in Rhineland-Palatinate
Westerwaldkreis